Marek Łbik (born 30 January 1958 in Poznań) is a Polish sprint canoeist who competed from the late 1970s to the late 1980s. Competing in two Summer Olympics, he won two medals with Marek Dopierała at Seoul in 1988 with a silver in the C-2 500 m event and a bronze in the C-2 1000 m event.

Łbik also won eight medals at the ICF Canoe Sprint World Championships with two golds (C-2 500 m: 1987, C-2 10000 m: 1986), four silvers (C-2 500 m: 1985, 1987; C-2 1000 m: 1987, 1989), and two bronzes (C-2 500 m: 1979, C-2 1000 m: 1985).

He is current chairman of Polish sports club Warta Poznań.

References

External links
 
 
 

1958 births
Canoeists at the 1980 Summer Olympics
Canoeists at the 1988 Summer Olympics
Living people
Olympic canoeists of Poland
Olympic silver medalists for Poland
Olympic bronze medalists for Poland
Sportspeople from Poznań
Polish male canoeists
Olympic medalists in canoeing
ICF Canoe Sprint World Championships medalists in Canadian
Medalists at the 1988 Summer Olympics